Colloto is a place in the municipalities of Oviedo and Siero, Asturias, Spain.

Notable people
 Florina Alías (1921-1999), author

Oviedo
Siero